Lewitska Sopfia (Sonia) (Polish : Sofia Lewicka, Ukrainian: Cофія Пилипівна Левицька, French: Sonia Lewitska, ; born 9 March 1880 in Częstochowa, Russian Empire, now Poland; died 20 September 1937 in Paris) was a Polish-born French painter and printmaker.

Biography 

Sonia Lewitska was a Post-Impressionist painter, printmaker and illustrator of Ukrainian origin, sister of Ukrainian writer and diplomat Modest Pylypovych Levytskyi (1866, Vilkhivtsi (Вільхівці Чемеровецького району), Podillia, Ukraine - Lutsk, Ukraine). Her father was an inspector of the public schools of the Podillya province. He was a friend of Volodymyr Antonovych and Tadej Rylskyj, he was actively interested in social and cultural work. Her childhood was in Kyiv and Vilkhivtsi. Her mother Modesta Byshovska (Biszowska) came from the  Leszczyńskis (Leshchinskys). Her family was a highly educated and democratic, they spoke Ukrainian, well-fluent in German, French, Polish. Sonia graduated from Art School in Zhytomyr. In that town, at the age of 19, she got married Yustyn Manylovskyi, a local doctor, but he abused alcohol. After Art School she ran away from her husband, went to her parents in Vilkhivtsi, left her daughter Olga who was born with mental problems, and began to study Art with Serhiy Svetoslavsky in Kyiv. S.Svetoslavsky advised her to go to Paris and Sofia moved to Paris in 1905 to study painting.

Sonia Lewitska engaged in a refined art without losing what a poet called the gift of childhood. Independent, she eschewed all art theory and only investigated the best means of translating her own interior vision into art. Often inspired by Slavic folklore. Lewitska was another early member of the Parisian group. In 1905 she settles in Paris and continued her studies at a Jean Marchand, who later became her husband. Beginning as a cubist and fauvist, she moved into a Post-Impressionist style and became known for her illustrations of limited edition books.

She exhibited at the Salon d'Automne (1910–1913, 1919–1925, 1927–1934), the Salon des Indépendants (1910–1914, 1920–1922), the Section d'Or, the Salon des Tuileries (1929, 1932, 1933), the Paris galleries and at the International exhibitions.

In 1933 she took part in Salon de Echanges. At the same time, in accompany with her friend Henriette Tirman, she helps André Fau and Francis Thieck in room decoration suggesting services of painters from her closest circle: Raoul Dufy, André Lhote, André Hellé and Jean Marchand. Thereby she supported her friends in tough times of economic crisis in the country.

In 1937, Henriette Tirman with friends creates in her house the Society of Friends Sonia Lewitska, which organized in 1938 two retrospective exhibitions of the artist in the Gallery Sagot – Le Garrec.

Illustrations 
 Jean Cocteau, Bertrand Guégan (1892–1943); L'almanach de Cocagne pour l'an 1920–1922, Dédié aux vrais Gourmands Et aux Francs Buveurs (1921)

References

Notes 
 Bénézit, 1976 : Sonia Lewitska

External links 
 Works Sonia Lewitzka, artnet.com
 Искусство и архитектура Русского зарубежья, Левицкая София (Соня) Филипповна; artrz.ru
 Van Gogh Museum Journal 1995, p.176, Portrait of Mme Sonya Lewitzka, 1932, by Emile Bernard; no.S407M/1990; dbnl.org
  Comoedia (Paris), 1935-04-11, Une exposition qui nous oblige à méditer sur le cubisme éternel; BNF
 Alexis Gritchenko, Mes rencontres avec les artistes français, L'Harmattan, 2010, pp. 160–166
 (en) Vita Susak, Ukrainian artists in Paris. 1900–1939, Lviv, Rodovid Press, 2010

1880 births
1937 deaths
20th-century French painters
20th-century Russian painters
20th-century Polish painters
Landscape artists
French still life painters
Russian still life painters
Post-impressionist painters
Modern painters
Modern printmakers
Woodcut designers
French illustrators
French women illustrators
French women painters
Russian illustrators
Russian women illustrators
Russian women painters
Polish illustrators
Polish women painters
Polish women illustrators
Fauvism
20th-century French women artists
20th-century Polish women artists
20th-century French printmakers
Women graphic designers
French women printmakers
20th-century Russian women
Congress Poland emigrants to France